The 1969 Huckleby Mercury Poisoning was an incident in which Ernest Huckleby accidentally fed his hog grain containing mercury, which poisoned his family when they ate the hog. His daughter Ernestine Huckleby was worst affected, suffered from blindness and severe physical disabilities. Her photo later appeared in the National Geographic Magazine.

Mercury feed
In 1969 in Alamogordo, New Mexico, Ernest Huckleby purchased grain from the Golden West Seed Company to feed his hogs. As part of his purchase he was also given some "waste" grain which included some seeds, dyed pink in warning, which had been treated with a mercuric fungicide.  Unaware of the danger, Huckleby fed the mercury treated seed grain to a hog which he later slaughtered and fed to his wife, who was 3 months pregnant, and to his 8 children.  Several of Huckleby's hogs had appeared to be ill, and he believed that they were suffering from what farmers called the "blind staggers," but the hog he fed to his family had appeared unaffected.

Within 3 months the children had developed "ataxia, agitation, visual impairment, and impaired consciousness."    When born, baby Michael was severely neurologically impaired, blind, subject to convulsive seizures, and only minimally aware of his environment.  Ernestine, 8 years old, became blind, unable to sit unsupported or to roll over, unable to hold objects, incontinent and unable to speak.  Amos, 13 years old, became functionally blind, with sensory degradation and impaired coordination.  Dorothy Jean Huckleby, 20 years old, suffered from tunnel vision, slurred speech, impaired coordination and numbness and tingling in her extremities.  Mr. and Mrs. Huckleby were unaffected, which corresponds well with current medical findings that methylmercury is more dangerous to the developing nervous system of infants and children, but, for reasons the doctors did not understand, 4 of the Huckleby's 8 children—all of whom shared the meal—were unaffected.  Of the 4 that were affected, Dorothy Jean and Amos were hospitalized in a rehabilitation center in Roswell, New Mexico for 18 months.  When placed in the facility, Dorothy had not been able to stand or use her arms or legs, she had no control over her bowels and bladder, and was unable to speak.  After 18 months in the facility she had regained most of her function, a recovery her doctors and the press lauded as "miraculous."  At release, Amos was blind, confined to a wheelchair, and could speak only with difficulty.  Baby Michael was born blind and seriously mentally and physically impaired, and remained so.  Ernestine was placed in Gerald Champion Memorial Hospital in Alamogardo, where she remained in a coma for more than a year.  When she emerged from the coma, she was blind, with severe physical disability, and it was reported that "She may never understand what has happened to her."

Photograph
Ernestine Huckleby, 8 years old, became the "face" of methylmercury poisoning in the early 1970s after her photograph was published in the 1971 National Geographic publication As We Live and Breathe: the Challenge of Our Environment.  The iconic photograph of Ernestine, a young black girl with large staring eyes clutching her teddy bear, broke the heart of a nation. The photographer, James P. Blair, has said that "Of all the assignments I have had over the 35 years I was a staff photographer for the Society this was one of the saddest."

Campaign
Dorothy Jean later sued the Federal government alleging the government was negligent in oversight of the warning label on the treated seed as the label was insufficient to apprise the Golden West Seed Company of the possibility of food-chain poisoning.    She was unsuccessful.  The judge expressed his regret that in following the law, he was not able to reach a finding in Dorothy Jean's favor.  Most countries had restricted the use of organic mercurial fungicides in reaction to similar poisonings, but legal maneuvers stalled the de-registration of organo-mercurial fungicides in the United States, and it continued to be used as a seed treatment for some time. That use was still ongoing at least 10 years later as evidenced by the experience of a Yakima, Washington family whose home flock of chickens was contaminated through feeding of seed grain treated with a mercurial fungicide.

Death of Ernestine
Ernestine, who had been 8 years old when she was poisoned, suffered from quadriplegia, blindness, and severe mental retardation until her death at the age of 30.  An autopsy conducted showed cortical atrophy, neuronal loss, and gliosis, most pronounced in the paracentral and parietooccipital regions.  Massive amounts of inorganic mercury were discovered in her brain, a fact which led researchers to conclude "Since inorganic mercury crosses the blood-brain barrier poorly, biotransformation of methyl to inorganic mercury may have occurred after methylmercury crossed the blood-brain barrier, accounting for its persistence in brain and causing part of the brain damage."

References

Accidental deaths in New Mexico
Deaths from food poisoning
Mercury poisoning